ABS-7 was a geostationary communication satellite operated by ABS (formerly known as Asia Broadcast Satellite) which was designed and manufactured by Lockheed Martin on the A2100 platform. It featured 30 Ku-band and 3 Ka-band transponders to serve Afghanistan, the Middle East, and Pakistan operating from 116.1EL.

In May 2010, the satellite was sold to ABS and renamed into ABS-7. Its original name was Koreasat 3. The satellite was de-orbited from the geostationary arc and retired on February 16, 2022.

References 

Communications satellites
Spacecraft launched in 1999
1999 in spaceflight
Satellites using the A2100 bus